The United States Senate librarian is the chief librarian of the United States Senate Library. The Senate librarian reports to the secretary of the United States Senate. 

George S. Wagner, 1871—1875
George F. Dawson, 1875—1879
P. J. Pierce, 1879—1884
George M. Weston, 1884—1887
Alonzo W. Church, 1887—1901
James M. Baker, 1898—1901 (acting librarian)
Cliff Warden, 1901—1904 (acting librarian)
James M. Baker, 1904 (acting librarian)
Edward C. Goodwin, 1904—1906 (acting librarian)
Edward C. Goodwin, 1906—1921
Walter P. Scott, 1921—1923
Edward C. Goodwin, 1923—1930
James D. Preston, 1931—1935
Ruskin McArdle, 1935—1947
George W. Straubinger, 1947—1951
Richard D. Hupman, 1951—1953
Sterling Dean, 1953—1954
Richard D. Hupman, 1954 (acting librarian)
Gus J. Miller, 1954—1955
Richard D. Hupman, 1955—1973
Roger K. Haley, 1973—1997
Greg Harness, 1997—2008
Mary E. Cornaby, 2008—2009
Leona I. Faust, 2009—2022
Meghan Dunn, 2022—present

References

THE 125TH ANNIVERSARY OF THE SENATE LIBRARY (Senate - September 19, 1996), Congressional Record, Library of Congress
U.S. Senate Website

United States Senate
Librarians of the United States Senate
Senate, United States
Librarian